Herbert Martin (29 August 1925 – 29 September 2016) was a Saarland and German footballer.

The striker spent the majority of his career with 1. FC Saarbrücken. He was the leading goal scorer for the Saarland national football team (tied with Herbert Binkert), with six goals, while the team existed between 1950 and 1956. He won 17 caps for the Saar federation which was later included into the West German Football Association. He died in 2016.

References

External links
 
 
 

1925 births
2016 deaths
People from Saarlouis (district)
Saar footballers
German footballers
Saarland international footballers
1. FC Saarbrücken players
Association football forwards
Footballers from Saarland